Vriesea elata is a species of flowering plant in the Bromeliaceae family. It is an epiphyte native to Venezuela, Colombia, and Ecuador.

Cultivars
 Vriesea 'Grande'

References

elata
Flora of South America
Epiphytes
Plants described in 1888
Taxa named by John Gilbert Baker
Taxa named by Lyman Bradford Smith